Maria Weizmann (born 1893- died 1974 ) was a sister of Israeli politician and scientist Chaim Weizmann (the first President of the State of Israel). She graduated from a university in Switzerland and worked as a doctor in Moscow from 1915.

Maria Weizman and her husband V.M. Savitsky were long denied the right to emigrate from the Soviet Union by the authorities. Her husband was arrested in 1949.

On February 10, 1953 she was arrested in connection with the alleged Doctors' plot. Her case was handled by the GRU (as opposed to MGB as it was common), an evidence of its importance to the Soviet regime. 

After Joseph Stalin's death and the admission by the Soviet leadership that the "plot" was made up, she was still kept in Lubyanka prison, and released only on August 12, 1953. Weizmann emigrated to Israel in 1956.

She was officially rehabilitated after Perestroika in 1989.

References

External links
Materials on the case of Maria Weizmann (in Russian)

1893 births
Refuseniks
Year of death missing
Soviet Jews
Soviet women physicians
Soviet physicians
20th-century Israeli physicians
Israeli women physicians
Soviet emigrants to Israel
Maria
Physicians from Moscow